Lizeth is a feminine given name. Notable people with the name include:
 Lizeth González (born 1986), Colombian model
 Lizeth Rueda (born 1994), Mexican swimmer
 Lizeth López (born 1990), Mexican volleyball player
 Lizeth Mahecha (born 1970), Colombian lawyer

Feminine given names